Bryan Andrew Wilson (born November 3, 1983) is an American gospel musician. He calls his music "spiritual soul" because it combines the passion of faith with the sound of R&B. Wilson began his career as a child gospel star, belting out "His Eye is on the Sparrow" with the Mississippi Children's Choir in the 1990s. After nearly a decade away from the music business, Wilson resurfaced in 2008 with an adult R&B-flavored style of urban inspirational gospel music that has proven successful with his recent Billboard Magazine chart hits, "Turning Away" (2014) and "Overflow" (2016). Billboard magazine Gospel Albums chart.

Early life
Wilson was born Bryan Andrew Wilson in Danville, Illinois on November 3, 1983 to Sheila Davis Wilson and Beau Briggs. Wilson came into prominence when he led the song "His Eye is on the Sparrow" with the Mississippi Children's Choir when he was young. The song was featured on the live recording "A New Creation," which sold 100,000 units in 1995. The YouTube videos of Wilson performing the song have amassed more than three million views, and the success led to a recording deal with Malaco Records. His debut album, "Bryan's Songs," was produced by gospel legends such as Kirk Franklin, John P. Kee, and Walter Hawkins. The album earned Wilson the Dove Award and Stellar Gospel Music Award nominations. He performed his radio single, "Blessed Assurance," to a standing ovation on the Stellar Awards in 1997. After his voice changed, Wilson temporarily lost his upper vocal range. "I remember going places and they would want me to sing in certain keys, and a couple of times some audiences, even though I was a teenager, they booed me."  Frustrated, Wilson figured his singing days were behind him, so he left music and enrolled in college. He graduated from Claflin University during their May 2004 commencement ceremony with a bachelor's degree in Religion and Philosophy. Subsequently, he went onto Princeton Theological Seminary, where he studied for a year. By 2008, Wilson had returned to music with his third solo album, "A Second Coming." It received a rave review from Billboard Magazine's gospel editor, Gordon Ely, but the Dallas Morning News' reporter, Selwyn Crawford, was less enthusiastic. "It's a nice effort, but much of the CD sounds like what it is — a former star trying to reinvent himself. Too bad that Bryan Wilson's `second coming' is not the one we're looking for."

Music career
After seven years of trying to find a new musical footing, Wilson finally hit pay dirt in 2014 with the release of the haunting ballad, "Turning Away." It reached No. 15 on Billboard Magazine's Gospel Airplay chart and No. 21 on its Hot Gospel Songs chart. "My message is gospel, but I'm singing from my soul, my experience," he told The Clarion Ledger's Jacob Threadgill in an interview. "If you hear a crack in my voice, it is because of the pain that I had to go through." It anchored his fifth album, "The One Percent." The project featured a variety of musical styles.  He gave Ben E. King's 1961 classic, "Stand by Me," a Caribbean dance flavor, and he injected Jesus Culture's epic tune, "Show Me Your Glory" with a shot of gospel energy and fused it with a festive rendition of Will Reagan's "Set A Fire." An ASCAP editor wrote of the album that, "Wilson blends a mix of modern soul, funk and gospel styles in songs full of infectious arrangements and personal lyrics. This passionate and vibrant recording is a testament to gospel music's enduring power and growth." Wilson continued his musical comeback with "Overflow (Let Your Spirit)," which features the group Roderick Giles & Grace on background vocals. It reached No. 12 on Billboard Magazine's Gospel Airplay chart, No. 20 on its Hot Gospel Songs chart and No. 1 on its Gospel Recurrent chart in the summer of 2016. The upbeat track earned Wilson his first Stellar Gospel Music Award nominations since his teenage years. It was nominated in the categories of Traditional Male Vocalist of the Year and Best Duo/Group of the Year.

Wilson's latest radio single, "Whoa!," is an inspirational, feel-good track. In the Journal of Gospel Music, editor Bob Marovich writes that, "Wilson opens 2017 with a well-crafted single whose message of encouragement is a life saver in the midst of a swirling rapid...`Whoa!' is a fine follow up to `Overflow' and much closer  to `Turning Away' in appeal. Check out Bryan's crystalline high notes at the end."

Albums/EPs

Radio Singles

References

External links
 Official website
 Cross Rhythms artist profile

1981 births
Living people
African-American male songwriters
African-American Christians
Singers from Illinois
Songwriters from Illinois
People from Danville, Illinois
Singers from Washington, D.C.
Songwriters from Washington, D.C.
Claflin University alumni
20th-century African-American male singers
21st-century African-American male singers